BFHS may stand for one of several high schools, including:

Beaver Falls High School (Beaver Falls, Pennsylvania)
Benjamin Franklin High School (multiple locations in the United States)
Big Foot High School in (Walworth, Wisconsin)
Bishop Feehan High School (Attleboro, Massachusetts)
Bishop Fenwick High School (Peabody, Massachusetts)
Bishop Fenwick High School (Franklin, Ohio)
Bishop Foley Catholic High School (Madison Heights, Michigan)
Bonners Ferry High School (Bonners Ferry, Idaho)

Other uses include:

 Benign fibrous histiocytomas (plural, as BFHs)
 Benjamin F Hunt & Sons, an Austrian porcelain maker from the early 20th century; the "BFHS" marking can be seen on items crafted by the company
 Berkshire Family History Society in England
 Borders Family History Society in Scotland
 British Federation for Historical Swordplay